The SS Melville E. Stone was a Liberty ship built in the United States during World War II.  She was named after Melville Elijah Stone (August 22, 1848 – February 15, 1929), a newspaper publisher, founder of the Chicago Daily News, and one time general manager of the reorganized Associated Press.

History
The ship's keel was laid in Permanente Metals Richmond, CA, Yard 2 on July 2, 1943 as hull number 1715, type EC2-S-C1. She was launched on July 24, 1943 and delivered on August 4, 1943. The Melville E. Stone was 22 days on the Ways, 12 days in the Water and 34 days to Delivery. After delivery to the War Shipping Administration, she was operated by Norton Lilly & Company, NY.
 	
The ship had been at sea less than seven hours when the torpedoes were spotted by a lookout. The first torpedo struck on the port side in the settling tank and the second hit ten seconds later near #4 hold. The explosions opened large holes in the side and extensively damaged the main and auxiliary engines. As the ship settled rapidly on an even keel, the 42-man complement, 23 armed guards and 23 passengers (military personnel) abandoned ship immediately in rough seas. Two of the lifeboats capsized from the suction created by the ship, which sank within eight minutes and several men drowned, including the master. Three boats got away and were later picked up men from rafts and debris. The survivors were later spotted by an aircraft, which dropped flares so that the American submarine chasers USS SC-1023 and USS SC-662 could pick them up. Five officers, seven crewmen, two armed guards and one passenger were lost.

In the Media
On February 20, 1944, The New York Times reported:

"CAPTAIN, RADIO MAN HEROES AS SHIP SINKS"

"Go Down at Posts as Torpedoes Doom the Melville E. Stone"

"WASHINGTON, Feb. 19 (AP) – Accounts of heroism abounded in the War Shipping Administration's report tonight on the torpedoing of the Liberty ship Melville E. Stone in the Caribbean Sea with the loss of sixteen lives.

Last aboard was the ship's master, Capt. Lawrence J. Gallagher of Sacramento, Calif., who refused to pause in his direction of abandon-ship efforts long enough to don a life-preserver. A rope thrown to him from the last waiting lifeboat fell short and the captain was never seen after the war freighter went down.

A civilian passenger, John M. Atkinson, saved the life of the commander of the Navy's armed guard on the vessel, Lieutenant (J.G.) Ernest Edward Tucker of Oak Park, Ill. Lieutenant Tucker said Mr. Atkinson, at great personal peril, held him above the surface until he could be pulled into a lifeboat.

The ship, named for the former general manager of The Associated Press, had a cargo of strategic materials. The radio operator, Peter A. Carrier of Columbia, Mo., stayed at his key to the last. With the aid of a light held by Captain Gallagher, he flashed the SOS before going down with the ship."

References

Further reading

1943 ships
Ships built in Richmond, California
Liberty ships
Ships sunk by German submarines in World War II
World War II shipwrecks in the Atlantic Ocean
Maritime incidents in November 1943